Aplysia fasciata, common name the "mottled sea hare", or the "sooty sea hare", is an Atlantic species of sea hare or sea slug, a marine opisthobranch gastropod mollusk in the family Aplysiidae.

Distribution
This sea hare occurs in the Western Atlantic from New Jersey to Brazil, and in the Eastern Atlantic including the Mediterranean and the West African coast. They have also been sighted along the Atlantic coast of France. It is a rare visitor to the seas off the southern British Isles (the related A. punctata is regular along most British coasts, as well as the northeast Atlantic).

Some consider the species Aplysia brasiliana, found in the Atlantic coast of the Americas, to be a synonym of Aplysia fasciata with just a different regional colour pattern.

Description

Aplysia fasciata can grow to sizes up to 40 cm long. Coloring is often black or a very dark brown, sometimes with a thin red border to the parapodia, foot, and tentacles. Many also have mottled spots which span across their body, earning the name "mottled sea hare". Aplysia fasciata have, like most sea slugs, two oral tentacles and two more smaller rhinopores in front on their neck. Eyes are positioned in front of the rhinopores. Small, rounded "tails" are fixed to their hindside. A mantle covers its gills and internal organs. Inside the mantle, a thin, delicate inner shell lays. The shell is concave, with amber coloring and a slightly hooked apex. Inside the mantle is the ink gland.

Behavior 

Aplysia fasciata eat algae and seaweed attached to rocks and other surfaces. They are often seen swimming in groups, along tide pools and rocks.

These sea hares also secrete a sort of ink. The ink takes on a purple hue, a result of eating red algae. It is believed to be non-toxic, though is assumed that the ink is secreted as a result of a sort of physical "assault" on the sea hare.

Egg masses appear as a long, pale cream mass. They are somewhat noodle-like in appearance. Aplysia fasciata are known for their "graceful" swimming.  They often flap their parapodia, often being described as  "flapping wings".

References

 Abbott, R.T. (1974). American Seashells. 2nd ed. Van Nostrand Reinhold: New York, NY (USA). 663 pp.
 Vine, P. (1986). Red Sea Invertebrates. Immel Publishing, London. 224 pp.
 Turgeon, D.; Quinn, J.F.; Bogan, A.E.; Coan, E.V.; Hochberg, F.G.; Lyons, W.G.; Mikkelsen, P.M.; Neves, R.J.; Roper, C.F.E.; Rosenberg, G.; Roth, B.; Scheltema, A.; Thompson, F.G.; Vecchione, M.; Williams, J.D. (1998). Common and scientific names of aquatic invertebrates from the United States and Canada: mollusks. 2nd ed. American Fisheries Society Special Publication, 26. American Fisheries Society: Bethesda, MD (USA). . IX, 526 + cd-rom pp. (look up in IMIS)
page(s): 122
 Gofas, S.; Le Renard, J.; Bouchet, P. (2001). Mollusca, in: Costello, M.J. et al. (Ed.) (2001). European register of marine species: a check-list of the marine species in Europe and a bibliography of guides to their identification. Collection Patrimoines Naturels, 50: pp. 180–213 (
 Martinez E. & Ortea J. (2002). On the synonymy between Aplysia winneba Eales, 1957 and Aplysia fasciata Poiret, 1789 (Mollusca: Opisthobranchia: Anaspidea). Iberus 20(2): 11-21 
 Rolán E., 2005.  Malacological Fauna From The Cape Verde Archipelago. Part 1, Polyplacophora and Gastropoda.
 Rosenberg, G., F. Moretzsohn, and E. F. García. 2009. Gastropoda (Mollusca) of the Gulf of Mexico, Pp. 579–699 in Felder, D.L. and D.K. Camp (eds.), Gulf of Mexico–Origins, Waters, and Biota. Biodiversity. Texas A&M Press, College Station, Texas.

External links
 

fasciata
Gastropods described in 1789
Molluscs of the Atlantic Ocean
Molluscs of the Mediterranean Sea